Markus Reitzig (born 1972) is a German organizational scientist, and professor of Strategic Management at the University of Vienna, where he has served as subject area chair since the group’s establishment in 2012. He is best known for his research on the strategic management of corporate innovation, and for his studies on the design of new organizational forms.

Biography
Reitzig received a B.Sc. degree (“Vordiplom”) in chemistry from the University of Constance in 1994 and a M.Sc. degree in chemistry (“Diplom-Chemiker”) from the University of Kiel in 1998. During his studies in law and chemistry he also visited Libera Università Internazionale degli Studi Sociali Guido Carli (LUISS Rome) and UC San Diego. In 2001 he completed his M.B.R. at the University of Munich, and he attained his PhD in business economics from the same university in 2002. He spent part of his PhD studies as a visiting scholar at the UC Berkeley. Reitzig’s studies were supported by scholarships from the Bayer Studienstiftung and the German Academic Exchange Service (DAAD).
In 2002 he became assistant professor at the Copenhagen Business School, where from 2004 to 2006 he worked as a tenured associate professor for Strategic Management. During this period, he was both a visiting associate professor at the Australian Graduate School of Management (AGSM) (in 2004 and 2005) and a visiting researcher at the Deutsche Bundesbank (2004 and 2005). From 2006 through 2012, Reitzig worked as an assistant professor for Strategic Management at the London Business School in England. In 2012, he assumed his current position at the University of Vienna. In 2014 and 2017, he was a visiting professor at INSEAD Business School, teaching on their Singapore Campus, and Keio University Tokyo, respectively.

Reitzig published numerous articles in peer-reviewed scientific journals as well as in practitioner magazines, and he has served on the editorial boards of journals such as the Strategic Management Journal (2013-), Organization Science (2014-), and the Journal of Organization Design (2015-). As of 2022, he has also been serving as a Contributing Editor to Strategy Science.
He was nominated for and bestowed upon several awards for his research, amongst others the Tietgen Prize  and the Bill Nobles Fellowship for his work on the design and leadership of non-traditional organizations, and received or was a finalist for diverse competitive research grants. Markus's latest book on the design and management of flat structures appeared in the spring of 2022. In January 2022, Professor Reitzig was listed among the top 15 researchers under 50 years of age by A/A+ publications in the Forschungsmonitoring Lifetime Ranking, which analyses the research of +2,100 business academics across Germany, Austria, and Switzerland  - and came in first in the same ranking in Austria in the above category. In addition to giving media interviews, Markus regularly speaks at corporate and public events. Amongst others, he presented at the TEDx events "Aiming High"  in Kufstein, Austria, in 2016,  and "Adventures within Work" in Vienna, Austria, in 2020 

For the past two decades, Markus has also been an independent advisor to numerous (inter)national organizations in his area of expertise. As of 2023, he has assumed the role as Organization Design Expert and Scientific Advisor to Mercer Germany, working closely with their European transformations group on client projects.

Articles

“Corporate Hierarchy and Vertical Information Flow within the Firm - a Behavioral View,” Strategic Management Journal, 36/13 2015, 1979–1999 (with Maciejovsky, B.).
“What's 'New' about New Forms of Organizing?,” Academy of Management Review, 39/2 2014, 162-180 (with Puranam, P. and Alexy, O.).
“On Sharks, Trolls, and Their Patent Prey – Unrealistic Damage Awards and Firms’ Strategies of ‘Being Infringed’”, Research Policy, 36/1 2007, 134‐154  (with Henkel, J. and Heath, C.).
Managing the Business Risks of ‘Open’ Innovation, McKinsey Quarterly, Winter , 17-21 (with Alexy, O.).
Smart Idea Selection – Is Your Company Choosing the Best Innovation Ideas? Sloan Management Review, Summer 2011, 47-52.
Big Picture – Patent Sharks, Harvard Business Review, June 2008, 129-133 (with Henkel, J.).

References

External links
 TEDx talk on 20 September 2020
 TEDx talk on 25 June 2016 
 Interview in BRANDEINS, February 2016 
 Markus Reitzig's Google Scholar profile
 Markus Reitzig's profile at the University of Vienna
 Markus Reitzig wins Bill-Nobles Fellowship
 List of Tietgen Award recipients
 "Get better at Flatter" by Markus Reitzig

German economists
1972 births
Living people
Ludwig Maximilian University of Munich alumni
Academic staff of the University of Vienna